Quan Văn Chuẩn (born 7 January 2001) is a Vietnamese professional footballer who plays as a goalkeeper for V.League 1 club Hà Nội and the Vietnam national under-23 team.

Honours
Hà Nội
V.League 1: 2022
Vietnam U23
Southeast Asian Games: 2021

References

External links
 

2001 births
Living people
Rade people
People from Tuyên Quang province
Vietnamese footballers
Association football goalkeepers
Hanoi FC players

Vietnam youth international footballers
Competitors at the 2021 Southeast Asian Games
Southeast Asian Games competitors for Vietnam